The sixth season of Greece's Next Top Model (abbreviated as GNTMgr, also known as Greece's Next Top Model: Boys & Girls) premiered on September 12, 2021 and is the fourth season to air on Star Channel. Like last season, boys can also participate.

Genevieve Majari, Angelos Bratis & Dimitris Skoulos return as judges, while Ismini Papavlasopoulou replaces Vicky Kaya as a judge.

The prizes for this season included a two-year modelling contract with Elite Model Management in London, a jewelry set from House of Jewels, an Opel Mokka and a cash prize of €50,000.

Like last year, there isn't any international destination due to COVID-19 pandemic.

The winner of the competition was the 19-year old Kyveli Hatziefstratiou.

Cast

Contestants
(Ages stated are at start of contest)

Judges
 Ismini Papavlasopoulou
 Angelos Bratis
 Dimitris Skoulos
 Genevieve Majari

Other cast members
 George Karavas – mentor
 Genevieve Majari – art director

Episode summaries

Episodes 1–5: Auditions
The show kicked off with the audition phase. Auditions took place in two different cities: Athens and Thessaloniki with all safety measures due to COVID-19 pandemic. The auditions aired for the first episodes of the show. During the auditions, the boys & girls had a brief interview with the judges while they also walked in swimwear, if asked. In order to advance, they needed a "yes" from at least 3 of the judges.

Episodes 5–6: Bootcamp

First Part: ID catwalk

Second Part: Photoshoot

Golden Pass Winner: Eirini Lempesi
Featured photographer: Panagiotis Simopoulos

Episode 7: Hug
Original airdate: 

The 20 contestant arrive with their suitcases on the roof of a summer cinema and become spectators, along with the judges and their coach George Karavas to watch a magic clip: George and Ismini represent in a cinematic reference the longing for human contact, which was so deprived of the era of COVID-19. In one of the most interactive exit trials, contestants are called upon to suddenly come very close, overcome taboos and contractions, and express the romance of youthful love as they are set in pairs and try to prove, with their model poses and their acting ability that they are not accidental in the top 20, while they are photographed in the lens of Kosmas Koumianos.

The next day begins with a numb mood and anxiety for the first departure. Everyone wears their goodies for the big night of results. They arrive to the model house and their first elimination located in a wonderful garden. Anna and Thanos got first call-out with Anna won the best photo, and Giannis, Ioanna, Stella & Thodoris landed in the bottom. Only this year, things are different as the safe contestants will get to save somebody who is in the bottom. As a result, Giannis & Stella were both save thanks to the others vote. In the end, Ioanna was the first to be eliminated. After the elimination, the remaining contestants moved into their model house.

First call-out: Anna Valtatzi & Thanos Dimitriou
Bottom four: Giannis Boutos, Ioanna Fragoulidou, Stella Papadopoulou & Thodoris Tsarouhas
Saved: Giannis Boutos & Stella Papadopoulou
Bottom two: Ioanna Fragoulidou & Thodoris Tsarouhas
Eliminated: Ioanna Fragoulidou
Featured photographer: Kosmas Koumianos

Episode 8: Rock 'n Roll
Original airdate: 

First call-out: Napoleon Marios Mitsis
Bottom three: Anna Valtatzi, Stella Papadopoulou & Thanos Dimitriou
Saved: Thanos Dimitriou
Bottom two: Anna Valtatzi & Stella Papadopoulou
Eliminated: Stella Papadopoulou
Featured photographer: Dimitrios Kleanthous

Episode 9: The Makeover
Original airdate: 

The contestants received their makeovers. There was no panel held.

Challenge Winner: Olga Ntalla

Episode 10: Beach Party
Original airdate: 

First call-out: Eirini Lempesi
Bottom three: Ilias Aikaterinaris, Thodoris Tsarouhas & Vasilis Parotidis
Saved: Thodoris Tsarouhas
Bottom two: Ilias Aikaterinaris & Vasilis Parotidis
Eliminated: Ilias Aikaterinaris
Featured photographer: Panos Giannakopoulos

Episode 11: The Wave
Original airdate: 

Quit: Melina Rohrens
First call-out: Stylianos Floridis
Featured photographer: Apostolis Koukousas

Episode 12: The Fluid Catwalk
Original airdate: 

First call-out: Konstantinos Tsagaris
Bottom three: Giannis Boutos, Maria Koumara & Raphaela Rodinou
Saved: Maria Koumara
Bottom two: Giannis Boutos & Raphaela Rodinou
Eliminated: Raphaela Rodinou
Featured photographer: Spyros Hamalis

Episode 13: Dynasty
Original airdate: 

Challenge Winner: Kyveli Hatziefstratiou
First call-out: Dinos Kritsis
Bottom three: Anna Valtatzi, Thanos Dimitriou & Thodoris Tsarouhas
Eliminated: Thodoris Tsarouhas
Featured photographer: Joey Leo, Panagiotis Simopoulos

Episode 14: Mary Goes Around
Original airdate: 

First call-out: Napoleon Marios Mitsis
Bottom three: Kyveli Hatziefstratiou, Maria Koumara & Thanos Dimitriou
Saved: Maria Koumara
Bottom two: Kyveli Hatziefstratiou & Thanos Dimitriou
Eliminated: Thanos Dimitriou
Featured photographer: Panos Georgiou

Episode 15: Nightmares & Dreams
Original airdate: 

Quit: Vasilis Parotidis
First call-out: Dinos Kritsis
Bottom three: Anna Valtatzi, Maria Koumara & Napoleon Marios Mitsis
Saved: Maria Koumara
Bottom two: Anna Valtatzi & Napoleon Marios Mitsis
Eliminated: Anna Valtatzi

Episode 16: Farmers/Amish
Original airdate: 

Entered: Emilianos Klaudianos
Challenge Winner: Agapi Brooks
First call-out: Kyveli Hatziefstratiou
Bottom two: Dinos Kritsis & Giannis Boutos
Eliminated: Dinos Kritsis
Featured Photographer: Xander Romanov, Dimitrios Kleanthous

Episode 17: Fly Me To The Moon
Original airdate: 

Challenge Winner: Maria Koumara
First call-out: Kyveli Hatziefstratiou
Bottom two: Aggaios Pothitos & Stylianos Floridis
Eliminated: Aggaios Pothitos
Featured Photographer: Nikos Maliakos

Episode 18: Rodeo
Original airdate: 

Challenge Winner: Olga Ntalla
First call-out: Olga Ntalla
Bottom two: Emilianos Klaudianos & Giannis Boutos
Eliminated: Emilianos Klaudianos
Featured Photographer: Giorgos Kalfamanolis

Episode 19: Foureira Show
Original airdate: 

Returned: Aggaios Pothitos, Dinos Kritsis, Ioanna Fragoulidou & Thanos Dimitriou
First call-out: Konstantinos Tsagaris
Bottom two: Giannis Boutos & Napoleon Marios Mitsis
Eliminated: Giannis Boutos
Featured Photographer: Mike Tsitas

Episode 20: The Cube
Original airdate: 

First call-out: Napoleon Marios Mitsis
Bottom two: Dinos Kritsis & Ioanna Fragoulidou
Eliminated: Ioanna Fragoulidou
Featured Photographer: Xander Romanov

Episode 21: Horse Lovers
Original airdate: 

Challenge Winner: Konstantinos Tsagaris
First call-out: Eirini Lempesi
Bottom two: Dinos Kritsis & Thanos Dimitriou
Eliminated: Thanos Dimitriou
Featured Photographer: Apostolis Koukousas

Episode 22: After Party Hunger
Original airdate: 

First call-out: Olga Ntalla
Bottom two: Dinos Kritsis & Stylianos Floridis
Eliminated: Dinos Kritsis
Featured Photographer: Nassia Stouraiti

Episode 23: The Message
Original airdate: 

First call-out: Aggaios Pothitos
Bottom two: Maria Koumara & Stylianos Floridis
Eliminated: Maria Koumara
Featured Photographer: Bill Georgoussis

Episode 24: Don't Let Go
Original airdate: 

Challenge Winner: Olga Ntalla
First call-out: Kyveli Hatziefstratiou
Bottom two: Agapi Brooks & Stylianos Floridis
Eliminated: Stylianos Floridis
Featured Photographer: Panagiotis Simopoulos

Episode 25: Seven Sins
Original airdate: 

Challenge Winner: Agapi Brooks
First call-out: Olga Ntalla
Bottom two: Eirini Lempesi & Napoleon Marios Mitsis
Eliminated: Napoleon Marios Mitsis
Featured Photographer: Giorgos Kasapidis

Episode 26: Bratlock
Original airdate: 

First call-out: Konstantinos Tsagaris
Bottom two: Agapi Brooks & Aggaios Pothitos
Eliminated: Agapi Brooks
Featured Photographer: Antonis Giamouris

Episode 27: Fashion Pilgrimage
Original airdate: 

First call-out: Kyveli Hatziefstratiou
Bottom two: Aggaios Pothitos & Eirini Lempesi
Eliminated: Aggaios Pothitos
Featured Photographer: Konstantinos & Petros Sofikitis

Episode 28: Discoballs
Original airdate: 

First call-out: Kyveli Hatziefstratiou
Bottom two: Eirini Lempesi & Konstantinos Tsagaris
Eliminated: Eirini Lempesi
Featured Photographer: Kosmas Koumianos

Episode 29: Breakfast At Tiffany's, Ballroom - Final Part 1
Original airdate: 

Featured Photographer: Dimitris Skoulos

Episode 30: The Final Catwalk, Raise Your Glass - Final Part 2
Original airdate: 

Final three: Konstantinos Tsagaris, Kyveli Hatziefstratiou & Olga Ntalla
Third place: Konstantinos Tsagaris
Runner-up: Olga Ntalla
Winner: Kyveli Hatziefstratiou
Featured Photographer: Panagiotis Simopoulos

Results

 The contestant quit the competition
 The contestant was eliminated 
 The contestant won the competition

Bottom two
{| class="wikitable" border="2" style="text-align:center"
|-
!Episode
!Contestants
!Eliminated
|-
|7
|Ioanna & Thodoris
|style="background:lightblue"|Ioanna
|-
|8
|Anna & Stella
|style="background:lightblue"|Stella
|-
|10
|Ilias & Vasilis
|style="background:lightblue"|Ilias
|-
|11
|None
|style="background:crimson"|
|-
|12
|Giannis & Raphaela
|style="background:lightblue"|Raphaela
|-
|13
|Anna, Thanos & Thodoris
|style="background:lightgreen"|Thodoris
|-
|14
|Kyveli & Thanos
|style="background:lightgreen"|Thanos
|-
|rowspan=2|15
|rowspan=2|Anna & Napoleon
|style="background:crimson"|
|-
|style="background:Lightpink"|Anna
|-
|16
|Dinos & Giannis
|style="background:lightblue"|Dinos
|-
|17
|Aggaios & Stylianos
|style="background:lightblue"|Aggaios
|-
|18
|Emilianos & Giannis
|style="background:lightblue"|Emilianos
|-
|19
|Giannis & Napoleon
|style="background:Tomato"|Giannis
|-
|20
|Dinos & Ioanna
|style="background:lightgreen"|Ioanna
|-
|21
|Dinos & Thanos
|style="background:lightpink"|Thanos
|-
|22
|Dinos & Stylianos
|style="background:Tomato"|Dinos
|-
|23
|Maria & Stylianos
|style="background:lightblue"|Maria
|-
|24
|Agapi & Stylianos
|style="background:Tomato"|Stylianos
|-
|25
|Eirini & Napoleon
|style="background:lightpink"|Napoleon
|-
|26
|Agapi & Aggaios
|style="background:lightgreen"|Agapi
|-
|27
|Aggaios & Eirini
|style="background:lightpink"|Aggaios|-
|28
|Eirini & Konstantinos
|style="background: lightpink"|Eirini|-
|rowspan=3|30
|rowspan=3|Konstantinos, Kyveli & Olga
|-
|style="background:sienna"|Konstantinos|-
|style="background:silver"|Olga|}

 The contestant quit the competition
 The contestant was eliminated after their first time in the bottom two
 The contestant was eliminated after their second time in the bottom two
 The contestant was put through collectively to the next round
 The contestant was eliminated after their third time in the bottom two
 The contestant was eliminated after their fourth time in the bottom two
 The contestant was eliminated in the final judging and placed third
 The contestant was eliminated in the final judging and placed as the runner-up 

Average  call-out order
Episode 11 (except top two), 29 & 30 are not included.

 Photo shoots Episode 6 photo shoot: Sexy Car Washers (semifinals)Episode 7 photo shoot: Romance in PairsEpisode 8 photo shoot: Rock n' Roll in the SkyEpisode 10 photo shoot: Beach Party in pairsEpisode 11 photo shoot: The Human WaveEpisode 12 photo shoot: The Fluid Catwalk in pairsEpisode 13 photo shoot: DynastyEpisode 14 photo shoot: Mary Goes AroundEpisode 15 Runway shoot: Nightmares & DreamsEpisode 16 photo shoot: Posing as Farmers/Amish in pairsEpisode 17 photo shoot: Fly Me To The MoonEpisode 18 photo shoot: Posing on a Rodeo Bull for COOLVITEpisode 19 photo shoot: Foureira Runway ShowEpisode 20 photo shoot: Posing in a spinning CubeEpisode 21 photo shoot: Riding a horse in the lake DoxaEpisode 22 photo shoot: Luxury with Ismini by the food truckEpisode 23 photo shoot: The message Episode 24 photo shoot: Underwater posing with statueEpisode 25 photo shoot: Seven sinsEpisode 26 photo shoot: BratlockEpisode 27 photo shoot: Fashion PilgrimageEpisode 28 photo shoot: Posing in a Club with DiscoballsEpisode 29 photo shoots:''' Breakfast at Tiffany´s and Ballroom

Ratings

Note

  Outside top 20.
  Outside top 10.

References

Greece
2021 Greek television seasons
Television productions postponed due to the COVID-19 pandemic